Nitroguanidine - sometimes abbreviated NGu - is a colorless, crystalline solid that melts at 257 °C and decomposes at 254 °C. Nitroguanidine is an extremely insensitive but powerful high explosive. Wetting it with > 20 wt.-% water effects desensitization from HD 1.1 down to HD 4.1 (flammable solid).
Nitroguanidine is used as an energetic material, i.e., propellant or high explosive, precursor for insecticides, and for other purposes.

Manufacture
Nitroguanidine is produced worldwide on a large scale starting with the reaction of dicyandiamide (DCD) with ammonium nitrate to afford the salt guanidinium nitrate, which is then nitrated by treatment with concentrated sulfuric acid at low temperature.

[C(NH2)3]NO3   →    (NH2)2CNNO2  +  H2O

Nitroguanidine can also be generated by treatment of urea with ammonium nitrate (via the BMA process).  However, owing to problems of reliability and safety, this process has never been commercialized despite its attractive economic features.

Uses

Explosives
Nitroguanidine has been in use since the 1930s as an ingredient in triple-base gun propellants in which it reduces flame temperature, muzzle flash, and erosion of the gun barrel but preserves chamber pressure due to high nitrogen content. Its extreme insensitivity combined with low cost has made it a popular ingredient in insensitive high explosive formulations (e.g AFX-453, AFX-760, IMX-101, AL-IMX-101, IMX-103,  etc.).
 
Nitroguanidine's explosive decomposition is given by the following equation:
H4N4CO2 (s) → 2 H2O (g) + 2 N2 (g) + C (s)

Pesticides
Nitroguanidine derivatives are used as insecticides, having a comparable effect to nicotine.  Derivatives include clothianidin, dinotefuran, imidacloprid, and thiamethoxam.

Biochemistry
The nitrosoylated derivative, nitrosoguanidine, is often used to mutagenize bacterial cells for biochemical studies.

Structure
Following several decades of debate, it could be confirmed by NMR spectroscopy, and both x-ray and neutron diffraction that nitroguanidine exclusively exists as the nitroimine tautomer both in solid state and solution.

References 

Explosive chemicals
Propellants